The 2016 Ski Tour Canada was a cross-country skiing competition held as part of the 2015–16 FIS Cross-Country World Cup. It was the first tour of the FIS Cross-Country World Cup held in Canada. It began in Gatineau on March 1, 2016, and ended in Canmore on March 12, 2016. It consisted of eight stages, the first four held in Quebec, the remainder being held in Alberta. 

The competitors received half of the usual World Cup points for the individual stages at this event. For the overall standings they received four times the World Cup points compared to a regular individual World Cup event.

Standings

Stages

Stage 1
1 March 2016  Jacques Cartier Park (Gatineau), Canada

Stage 2
2 March 2016, Mount Royal (Montreal), Canada

Stage 3
4 March 2016, Plains of Abraham (Quebec City), Canada

Stage 4
5 March 2016, Plains of Abraham (Quebec City), Canada

Stage 5
8 March 2016, Canmore Nordic Centre Provincial Park, (Canmore), Canada

Stage 6
9 March 2016, Canmore Nordic Centre Provincial Park, (Canmore), Canada

Stage 7
11 March 2016, Canmore Nordic Centre Provincial Park, (Canmore), Canada

Stage 8
12 March 2016, Canmore Nordic Centre Provincial Park, (Canmore), Canada

References

Ski Tour Canada
FIS Cross-Country World Cup Finals by year
2016 in cross-country skiing
2016 in Canadian sports
March 2016 sports events in Canada
Cross-country skiing competitions in Canada